Edina Alves Batista (born 10 January 1980) is a Brazilian association football referee.

Career 

She was an official at two games in April 2018 at the 2018 Copa América Femenina held in Chile.

She officiated several matches at the 2019 FIFA Women's World Cup including the semi-final between England and the United States.

In 2020, she was an official at the 2020 South American Under-20 Women's Football Championship held in Argentina.

On 7 February 2021, she became the first woman to officiate at a senior FIFA men's tournament, taking charge of the fifth-place match between Ulsan Hyundai and Al-Duhail at the 2020 FIFA Club World Cup. On 3 March 2021, she became the first female referee to take charge of a man derby between Corinthians and Palmeiras in Brazil.

References 

1980 births
Living people
Brazilian football referees
FIFA Women's World Cup referees
Women association football referees
21st-century Brazilian women